1936 Országos Bajnokság I (men's water polo) was the 30th water polo championship in Hungary. There were eight teams who played one-round match for the title.

Final list 

* M: Matches W: Win D: Drawn L: Lost G+: Goals earned G-: Goals got P: Point

2. Class 
Budapest: 1. MUE 10, 2. NSC 9, 3. VAC 5, 4. MAFC 0 point.

Eastern Division: 1. MOVE Eger SE 10, 2. Orosházi UE 8, 3. Kecskeméti AC 6, 4. Szolnoki MÁV 4, 5. Egri TE 2, 6. Jászapáti Összetartás SE 0 point.

Western Division: 1. Győri ETO, 2. Tatabányai SC.

Final: MUE–Győri ETO 2:0, 0:0.

Sources 
Gyarmati Dezső: Aranykor (Hérodotosz Könyvkiadó és Értékesítő Bt., Budapest, 2002.)
Magyar Sport Almanach 1936

1936 in water polo
1936 in Hungarian sport
Seasons in Hungarian water polo competitions